{{DISPLAYTITLE:C21H29ClO3}}
The molecular formula C21H29ClO3 (molar mass: 364.90616 g/mol) may refer to:

 Clogestone, or chlormadinol
 Clostebol acetate
 Hydromadinone

Molecular formulas